Sangan in Qazvin Province may refer to:

Sangan-e Olya
Sangan-e Sofla, Qazvin